The 2000–01 United Counties League season was the 94th in the history of the United Counties League, a football competition in England.

Premier Division

The Premier Division featured 20 clubs which competed in the division last season, along with one new club:
Raunds Town, resigned from the Southern Football League

League table

Division One

Division One featured 18 clubs which competed in the division last season, no new clubs joined the division this season.

Northampton Vanaid changed name to Northampton Sileby Rangers.

League table

References

External links
 United Counties League

2000–01 in English football leagues
United Counties League seasons